Georg Jakob Steenke (born 30 June 1801 in Königsberg; died 22 April 1884 in Elbing) was a German architect and a königlicher Baurat (royal construction councillor) of the Kingdom of Prussia. His father Johann Friedrich Steenke and his grandfather, both also from Königsberg, were involved with maritime trade.

In 1833 Steenke built a canal, the Seckenburger Kanal, in the Memel (Klaipėda) area. He designed the Oberländischer Kanal (now called Elbląg Canal), which was built between 1844–58 from the Drausensee (Drużno) to the Drewenz (Drwęca) River. Inaugurated in 1860, it connected the cities of Deutsch Eylau (Iława), Osterode (Ostróda), and Elbing (Elbląg). It connected territories with about 100 yards differences in heights by putting ships on carriage carts on tracks and using pulley wheels and cables to have the ships glide up the hills.

A monument to honor Steenke was removed after the area became part of Poland in 1945. When UNESCO placed the canal on its list of architectural marvels, the monument was put up again in 1986.

1801 births
1884 deaths
German engineers
Architects from Königsberg
19th-century German architects